All That I Wanted may refer to:
"All That I Wanted" (Belfegore song), 1984 song
All That I Wanted – Acoustic EP, Jamie McDell album